Line 1: Barreiros ↔ Porto is currently the only operational line of Baixada Santista Light Rail in São Paulo state, Brazil, opened on 31 January 2016. The system is operated by Consórcio BR Mobilidade.

History
Opened on 31 January 2016, this was the first LRT line built in Baixada Santista Metropolitan Region, under the responsibility of Empresa Metropolitana de Transportes Urbanos de São Paulo (EMTU), reusing the track that cross the central areas of São Vicente and Santos, previously used by FEPASA, which operated the Intra Metropolitan Train between 1990 and 1999, and was used for cargo transportation until January 2008.

Stations

Barreiros ↔ Porto

References

External links
 Empresa Metropolitana de Transportes Urbanos de São Paulo
 BR Mobilidade

Public transport in Brazil
Tram transport in Brazil
Railway lines opened in 2016